Supreme is an American clothing and skateboarding lifestyle brand established in New York City in April 1994.

The brand aims to appeal to youth culture in general as well as the skateboarding and hip hop scenes specifically. The company makes skateboards in addition to clothing and accessories.

The red box logo with "Supreme" in white Futura Heavy Oblique is thought to be largely based on Barbara Kruger's art.

The Supreme brand is popular in China, Japan, Europe and the US.

Supreme is owned by VF Corporation.

History
The brand was founded by James Jebbia in 1994. The first Supreme store opened in an old office space on Lafayette Street in Lower Manhattan in April 1994. It was designed with skaters in mind with a unique design for the store layout: by arranging the clothes around the perimeter of the store, a large central space permitted skaters with backpacks to skate into the store and still feel comfortable. This store had its core group of skaters who served as its team in 1994, which included late actors Justin Pierce and Harold Hunter, and the first employees were extras from the Larry Clark film Kids. Jebbia explained that he opened Supreme in lower Manhattan  because at the time there was nowhere else to buy skate products in the area. He focused primarily on more obscure, harder-to-find items and credited the open-mindedness of skaters with the brand's ability to take risks.

In 2004, a second location was opened on North Fairfax Ave in Los Angeles, California, which is nearly double the size of the original New York City store and features an indoor skate bowl. Other locations include Paris, which opened in 2016, London, which opened in September 2011, Tokyo (Harajuku, Daikanyama and Shibuya), Nagoya, Osaka, and Fukuoka. The additional locations emulate the original Lafayette Street store's design; stores feature rotating art displays, and use videos and music to attract attention.

Supreme stocks its own clothing label, as well as other skateboard brands such as Vans, Nike SB, Spitfire Wheels, and Thrasher, among others. James Jebbia was quoted in saying that anything that Supreme releases will never be classified as "limited," but notes that they make short runs of their products because they "don't want to get stuck with stuff nobody wants."

Supreme releases two collections each year. Instead of offering the entire line at once, the brand releases a few pieces online and in-store from the current season’s collection every Thursday.

In October 2017, Supreme opened their 11th store and second in New York City in the Williamsburg neighborhood of Brooklyn. On October 6, 2017, James Jebbia confirmed that the label had sold a significant stake in the company of roughly 50% (around $500 million) to private equity firm The Carlyle Group. On February 25, 2019, Supreme moved their original Manhattan location from 274 Lafayette Street to 190 Bowery.

Supreme opened its 12th store on Market Street in San Francisco in October 2019.

In 2019, a collection of every Supreme deck ever produced sold for $800,000 at a Sotheby's auction.

In November 2020, VF Corporation announced that they agreed to buy Supreme in an all cash deal for US$2.1 billion. VF Corporation bought out the investors Carlyle Group and Goode Partners LLC, as well as founder James Jebbia. According to VF, Jebbia will continue to manage the business.

The 13th store of the company opened on May 6, 2021, in Milan.

Skate teams
The original Supreme skate team consisted of, Ryan Hickey, Justin Pierce, Gio Estevez, Paul Leung, Chris Keeffe, Jones Keeffe, Peter Bici, and Mike Hernandez. Other pro skaters, such as Harold Hunter and Jeff Pang, became associates of the company due to Supreme's roots within New York City's skate culture.

The current skate team, as of 2021, includes Aidan Mackey, Brian Anderson, Ben Kadow, Jason Dill, Sean Pablo, Na-Kel Smith, Tyshawn Jones, Mark Gonzales, Kader Sylla, Sage Elsesser, Rowan Zorilla, Seven Strong, Troy Gipson, Vince Touzery, Caleb Barnett, Kevin Bradley, Nik Stain, Kevin Rodrigues and Beatrice Domond.

Following the Paris store opening in 2016, Supreme also formed a French skate team that includes Dayanne Akadiri, Manuel Schenck, Lucien Momy, Dadoum Chabane, Damien Bulle, Victor Demonte, Valentin Jutant and Samir Krim.

Trademarks

Supreme has been granted trademarks in many countries within North America, Europe and Asia.

In 2018, Supreme lost a lawsuit in an Italian court, and the European Union refused to register its trademark, so "Supreme" branded items not licensed, approved, or manufactured by Supreme could be sold in Italy and Spain. Samsung was able to sign a promotion agreement with a fake Supreme brand in China. Finally, in November 2019, an appellate court of the European Union Intellectual Property Office (EUIPO) found that Supreme's brand is distinct and eligible for an EU trademark. "It has been widely demonstrated that the sign is used as a brand and in some cases seen as "‘cult’ in the field of streetwear," the court said.  
On August 27, 2020, EUIPO granted Supreme a Europe-wide trademark for bags, clothing and retail stores.

Awards
In 2018, Supreme was awarded the Council of Fashion Designers of America's Menswear Designer of the Year Award.

Marketing
Fashion photographer Terry Richardson has produced some of the brand's most notable photographs, including of Michael Jordan, Kermit the Frog, Three 6 Mafia, Lou Reed, Lady Gaga, Neil Young, Gucci Mane, Nas, and Morrissey.

William "Bill" Strobeck serves as Supreme's main filmer, and has created several web edits for the brand such as PUSSY GANGSTER (2016), CANDYLAND (2019) and STALLION (2021). Strobeck has also filmed and directed both of Supreme's full-length films - "cherry" (2014) and "BLESSED" (2018).

Collaborators
Kenneth Cappello made some Supreme photo tees like Mike Tyson, Dipset, and Raekwon.

During the Fall/Winter 2017 season Supreme collaborated with fashion house Louis Vuitton for a Menswear Collection. It was ranked as the best collaboration of 2017 by Vogue.

Supreme's collaboration with Takashi Murakami raised $1 million for COVID-19 pandemic relief.

Other notable brands that Supreme had collaborated with includes Kangol, Emilio Pucci, AntiHero Skateboards, New Era, True Religion, A Bathing Ape, Nike, Fox, Vans, The North Face, Spitfire Wheels, Champion, Stussy, Comme des Garçons, Timberland, Lacoste, Thrasher Magazine, Independent Trucks and many others.

Supreme collaborated with Yohji Yamamoto during late 2020, bringing in Yamamoto’s avant-garde tailoring and aesthetics. Supreme and Yohji Yamamoto would later collaborate again in mid 2022, this time bringing in graphics and designs from the video game series Tekken.

Filmography
Below is a list of official skate videos made for Supreme.

A Love Supreme (1995)
"cherry" (2014)
JOYRIDE (2014)
the red devil. (2015)
SICKNESS (2015)
SWOOSH (2015)
PUSSY GANGSTER (2016)
KING PUPPY (2016)
"BLESSED" (2018)
CANDYLAND (2019)
STALLION (2021)
MIND GOBLIN (2021)
"Play Dead" (2022)

References

External links
 

1994 establishments in New York City
American companies established in 1994
The Carlyle Group companies
Clothing brands of the United States
Clothing retailers of the United States
Clothing companies based in New York City
Shoe companies of the United States
Clothing companies established in 1994
Retail companies established in 1994
Skateboarding companies
2020 mergers and acquisitions
VF Corporation